The Idar Forest (German: Idarwald, Celtic: "id ar" - hill forest above the land) is part of the  Hunsrück low mountain range in the German federal state of Rhineland-Palatinate, Germany.

Geography 

The Idar Forest lies in the districts of Bernkastel-Wittlich and Birkenfeld in the northeast of the Saar-Hunsrück Nature Park. It lies more or less in the triangle formed by the villages of Morbach (in the northwest), Rhaunen (northeast) and Idar-Oberstein (southeast), but apart from Morbach – does not extend as far as these places.
The underlying rocks are primarily made up of Lower Devonian quartzites.

Mountains 

Amongst the highest mountains in the Idar Forest are:

 An den zwei Steinen (766 m)
 Kahlheid (766 m)
 Steingerüttelkopf (757 m)
 Ruppelstein (755 m)
 Idarkopf (746 m) - crowned by the Idarkopf Tower
 Usarkopf (724 m)

Bodies of water

Streams 

The following streams rise in, or on the edge of, the Idar Forest:

 Dhron
 Idarbach (Nahe) - rises between Erbeskopf and Kahlheid
 Idarbach (Hahnenbach) - rises north of the Idarkopf near Hochscheid
 Rhaunelbach
 Steinbach

Lakes and reservoirs 

The following lakes and reservoirs are located in, or on the edge of, the Idar Forest:

 Steinbach Reservoir on the Steinbach

Sources 
Uwe Anhäuser: Heimat am Idarwald. Literaturverlag Dr. Gebhardt und Hilden, Idar-Oberstein 2001, .

External links 
 Idarkopf

Central Uplands
Landscapes of Rhineland-Palatinate
Regions of Rhineland-Palatinate
Forests and woodlands of Rhineland-Palatinate
Natural regions of the Hunsrück
Mountain ranges of Rhineland-Palatinate